The Leconte Prize is a prize created in 1886 by the French Academy of Sciences to recognize important discoveries in mathematics, physics, chemistry, natural history or medicine. In recent years the prize has been awarded in the specific categories of mathematics, physics, and biology. Scientists and mathematicians of all nationalities are eligible for the award. The value of the award in the late 19th and early 20th century was F50,000 (at the time equivalent to £2,000, or US$10,000), about five times as much as the annual salary of the average professor in France. The award was F22,000 in 1984, F20,000 in 2001, €3,000 in 2008, €2,500 in 2010, €2,000 in 2014, and €1,500 in 2019.

The Leconte Prize was established with a donation from a businessman, Victor Eugene Leconte, to the academy. The donation specified that a F50,000 prize would be awarded every three years for outstanding past work, and that up to 1/8th of the interest earned by the fund each year could be awarded as encouragements, i.e., support for ongoing and future research. The academy did not award any large (F50,000) prizes between 1905 and 1916, but did award a total of F30,000 in encouragements during that period.

Recipients

See also

 List of biology awards
 List of mathematics awards
 List of physics awards

References

Physics awards
Mathematics awards
Biology awards
Awards of the French Academy of Sciences
1886 establishments in France
Awards established in 1886